Charles Bradley (15 May 1922 – 23 July 1984), also known as Charlie Bradley, was an English professional footballer who played as an inside forward in the Football League for York City, in non-League football for York Railway Institute and Scarborough, and played wartime football for York.

References

1922 births
Footballers from York
1984 deaths
English footballers
Association football forwards
York Railway Institute A.F.C. players
York City F.C. players
Scarborough F.C. players
English Football League players
York City F.C. wartime guest players
Association football midfielders